Bobby Gene Hill, Jr. (born April 20, 1995) is an American football defensive tackle for the Cincinnati Bengals of the National Football League (NFL). He played college football at NC State and was drafted by the New York Giants in the third round of the 2018 NFL Draft.

Early years
Along with football, Hill participated in track and field, baseball, and basketball at West Stanly High School.

College recruitment and rankings
Hill was listed as a three-star recruit by 247Sports.com and committed to NC State on June 12, 2013, to play football.

College career
Hill attended and played college football at NC State from 2014 to 2017.

Collegiate statistics

Professional career
On December 4, 2017, it was announced that Hill had accepted his invitation to play in the 2018 Senior Bowl. Hill was dominant during Senior Bowl practices and impressed scouts and team representatives. On January 27, 2018, Hill played in the 2018 Reese's Senior Bowl and was part of Denver Broncos' head coach Vance Joseph's North team that lost to the South 45–16. He attended the NFL Scouting Combine in Indianapolis and completed all of the combine and positional drills. Hill's overall performance helped raise his draft stock, as he finished third among all defensive linemen in the bench press, fifth in the three-cone drill, tied for 11th in the 20-yard shuttle, and finished 15th among his position group in the 40-yard dash. On March 19, 2018, Hill participated at NC State's pro day, but opted to stand on his combine numbers and only performed positional drills. Hill also attended a pre-draft visits with the Pittsburgh Steelers and Carolina Panthers. At the conclusion of the pre-draft process, Hill was projected to be a second or third round pick by NFL draft experts and scouts. He was ranked as the fifth best defensive tackle prospect in the draft by Scouts Inc. and was ranked the seventh best defensive tackle by DraftScout.com.

New York Giants

2018 season 
The New York Giants selected Hill in the third round with the 69th overall pick in the 2018 NFL Draft. Hill was the fifth defensive tackle drafted in 2018. The pick used to select Hill was acquired from the Tampa Bay Buccaneers in exchange for Jason Pierre-Paul.

On June 7, 2018, the New York Giants signed Hill to a four-year, $4.04 million contract that includes a signing bonus of $1.02 million. In Week 3, against the Houston Texans, he recorded his first career sack. In the next game, a loss to the New Orleans Saints, he recorded his second sack of the season.

2019 season 

Hill's statistics dropped in the 2019 season, only recording 36 tackles and one sack.

2020 season 
Hill recorded his first sack of the season on Mitchell Trubisky in a game against the Chicago Bears in Week 2.

Cincinnati Bengals

2021 season
On August 30, 2021, Hill was traded to the Cincinnati Bengals for center Billy Price. In the AFC Championship against the Kansas City Chiefs, he intercepted Patrick Mahomes when the Bengals were down 13-21 with 2:18 remaining in the third quarter, leading to the game-tying touchdown in the eventual 27–24 overtime victory.

2022 season
On March 15, 2022, Hill signed a three-year, $30 million contract extension with the Bengals.

References

External links
 Cincinnati Bengals bio
 N.C. State Wolfpack bio

1995 births
Living people
American football defensive tackles
Cincinnati Bengals players
NC State Wolfpack football players
New York Giants players
People from Oakboro, North Carolina
Players of American football from North Carolina